Srednji Vrh is a dispersed settlement in the hills west of Polhov Gradec in the Municipality of Dobrova–Polhov Gradec in the Upper Carniola region of Slovenia.

Name
The name Srednji Vrh literally means 'middle peak'. Srednji Vrh and names like it (e.g., Srednje) indicate that the settlement (or, in this case, the hill associated with it) lay in some sort of central or middle position. The name is unrelated to names derived from sreda 'Wednesday' (e.g., Središče ob Dravi).

Gallery

References

External links

Srednji Vrh on Geopedia

Populated places in the Municipality of Dobrova-Polhov Gradec